Artistic swimming has been contested at the Asian Games since the 1994 Games. The current Asiad program has competition in duet and team events, but in past games, solo and combination events were also contested.

Editions

Events

Medal table

Participating nations

List of medalists

References

External links 
 Sports 123: Asian Games
 Olympic Council of Asia - Games

 
Asian Games
Sports at the Asian Games